Thomas Ahern may refer to:
 Thomas Ahern (businessman), owner and manager of the Western Australian department store chain Aherns
 Thomas Ahern (rugby union), Irish rugby union player

See also
 Thomas Ahearn, Canadian inventor and businessman